Lake Shaster is a hypersaline lake in the Goldfields-Esperance region of Western Australia, approximately  west of Esperance.

The lake is located in the Lake Shaster Nature Reserve which is found on either side of the Oldfield Estuary Reserves. The  lake is one of the largest lakes in the district and supports few waterbirds.

See also

 List of lakes of Western Australia

References

Shaster
Shaster